Grindstone Mountain is a mountain in the Elko Hills of Elko County, Nevada, United States. There are several radio towers at the summit.

References

External links

Mountains of Elko County, Nevada
Mountains of Nevada